Inayatullah Khan Mashriqi (August 1888  27 August 1963), also known by the honorary title Allama Mashriqi, was a British Indian, and later, Pakistani mathematician, logician, political theorist, Islamic scholar and the founder of the Khaksar movement.

Around 1930, he founded the Khaksar Movement. aiming to advance the condition of the masses irrespective of any faith, sect, or religion.

Early years

Background
Inayatullah Khan Mashriqi was born on 25 August 1888 to a Rajput family in Amritsar. Mashriqi's father Khan Ata Muhammad Khan was an educated man of wealth who owned a bi-weekly publication, Vakil, in Amritsar. His forefathers had held high government positions during the Mughal Empire and Sikh Empires. Because of his father's position he came into contact with a range of well-known luminaries including Jamāl al-Dīn al-Afghānī, Sir Syed Ahmad Khan, and Shibli Nomani as a young man.

Education
Mashriqi was educated initially at home before attending schools in Amritsar. From an early age, he showed a passion for mathematics. After completing his Bachelor of Arts degree with First Class honours at Forman Christian College in Lahore, he completed his master's degree in mathematics from the University of the Punjab, taking a First Class for the first time in the history of the university.

In 1907 he moved to England, where he matriculated at Christ's College, Cambridge, to read for the mathematics tripos. He was awarded a college foundation scholarship in May 1908. In June 1909 he was awarded first class honours in Mathematics Part I, being placed joint 27th out of 31 on the list of wranglers. For the next two years, he read for the oriental languages tripos in parallel to the natural sciences tripos, gaining first class honours in the former, and third class in the latter.

After three years' residence at Cambridge he had qualified for a Bachelor of Arts degree, which he took in 1910. In 1912 he completed a fourth tripos in mechanical sciences, and was placed in the second class. At the time he was believed to be the first man of any nationality to achieve honours in four different Triposes, and was lauded in national newspapers across the UK. The next year, Mashriqi was conferred with a DPhil in mathematics receiving a gold medal at his doctoral graduation ceremony.

He left Cambridge and returned to India in December 1912. During his stay in Cambridge his religious and scientific conviction was inspired by the works and concepts of Professor Sir James Jeans.

Early career
On his return to India, Mashriqi was offered the premiership of Alwar, a princely state, by the Maharaja. He declined owing to his interest in education. At the age of 25, and only a few months after arriving in India, he was appointed vice principal of Islamia College, Peshawar, by Chief Commissioner Sir George Roos-Keppel and was made principal of the same college two years later. In October 1917 he was appointed under secretary to the Government of India in the Education Department in succession to Sir George Anderson. He became headmaster of the High School, Peshawar on 21 October 1919.

In 1920, the British government offered Mashriqi the ambassadorship of Afghanistan, and a year later he was offered a knighthood. However, he refused both awards.

In 1930, he was passed over for a promotion in the government service, following which he went on medical leave. In 1932 he resigned, taking his pension, and settled down in Ichhra, Lahore.

Nobel nomination
In 1924, at the age of 36, Mashriqi completed the first volume of his book, Tazkirah. It is a commentary on the Qur'an in the light of science. It was nominated for the Nobel Prize in 1925, subject to the condition it was translated into one of the European languages. However, Mashriqi declined the suggestion of translation.

Political life

Mashriqi's philosophy
A theistic evolutionist who accepted some of Darwin's ideas while criticizing others, he declared that the science of religions was essentially the science of collective evolution of mankind; all prophets came to unite mankind, not to disrupt it; the basic law of all faiths is the law of unification and consolidation of the entire humanity. According to Markus Daeschel, the philosophical ruminations of Mashriqi offer an opportunity to re-evaluate the meaning of colonial modernity and notion of post-colonial nation-building in modern times.

Mashriqi is often portrayed as a controversial figure, a religious activist, a revolutionary, and an anarchist; while at the same time he is described as a visionary, a reformer, a leader, and a scientist-philosopher who was born ahead of his time.

After Mashriqi resigned from government service, he laid the foundation of the Khaksar Tehrik (also known as Khaksar Movement) around 1930.

Mashriqi and his Khaskar Tehrik opposed the partition of India. He stated that the "last remedy under the present circumstances is that one and all rise against this conspiracy as one man. Let there be a common Hindu-Muslim Revolution. ... it is time that we should sacrifice…in order to uphold Truth, Honour and Justice." Mashriqi opposed the partition of India because he felt that if Muslims and Hindus had largely lived peacefully together in India for centuries, they could also do so in a free and united India. Mashriqi saw the two-nation theory as a plot of the British to maintain control of the region more easily, if India was divided into two countries that were pitted against one another. He reasoned that a division of India along religious lines would breed fundamentalism and extremism on both sides of the border. Mashriqi thought that "Muslim majority areas were already under Muslim rule, so if any Muslims wanted to move to these areas, they were free to do so without having to divide the country." To him, separatist leaders "were power hungry and misleading Muslims in order to bolster their own power by serving the British agenda."

Imprisonments and allegations
On 20 July 1943, an assassination attempt was made on Muhammad Ali Jinnah by Rafiq Sabir who was assumed to be a Khaksar worker. The attack was deplored by Mashriqi, who denied any involvement. Later, Justice Blagden of the Bombay High Court in his ruling on 4 November 1943 dismissed any association between the attack and the Khaksars.

In Pakistan, Mashriqi was imprisoned at least four times: in 1958 for alleged complicity in the murder of republican leader Khan Abdul Jabbar Khan (popularly known as Dr. Khan Sahib); and, in 1962 for suspicion of attempting to overthrow President Ayub's government. However, none of the charges were proven, and he was acquitted in each case.

In 1957, Mashriqi allegedly led 300,000 of his followers to the borders of Kashmir, intending, it is said, to launch a fight for its liberation. However, the Pakistan government persuaded the group to withdraw and the organisation was later disbanded.

Death
Mashriqi died at the Mayo Hospital in Lahore on 27 August 1963 following a short battle with cancer.  His funeral prayers were held at the Badshahi Mosque and he was buried in Ichhra.  He was survived by his wife and seven children.

Mashriqi's works
Mashriqi's prominent works include:

Armughan-i-Hakeem, a poetical work
Dahulbab, a poetical work
Isha’arat, the "Bible" of the Khaksar movement
Khitab-e-Misr (The Egypt Address), based on his 1925 speech in Cairo as a delegate to the Motmar-e-Khilafat
Maulvi Ka Ghalat Mazhab
Tazkirah Volume I, 1924, discussions on conflicts between religions, between religion and science, and the need to resolve these conflicts
Tazkirah Volume II. Posthumously published in 1964
Tazkirah Volume III.

Fellowships
Mashriqi's fellowships included:

Fellow of the Royal Society of Arts, 1923
Fellow of the Geographical Society (F.G.S), Paris
Fellow of Society of Arts (F.S.A), Paris
Member of the Board at Delhi University
President of the Mathematical Society, Islamia College, Peshawar
Member of the International Congress of Orientalists (Leiden), 1930
President of the All World's Faiths Conference, 1937

Edited works
God, Man, and Universe: As Conceived by a Mathematician (works of Inayatullah Khan el-Mashriqi), Akhuwat Publications, Rawalpindi, 1980 (edited by Syed Shabbir Hussain).

See also
All India Azad Muslim Conference
Teilhard de Chardin
Karl Marx

References

1888 births
1963 deaths
20th-century Indian philosophers
Alumni of Christ's College, Cambridge
Indian anti-poverty advocates
Forman Christian College alumni
Indian expatriates in the United Kingdom
Indian humanitarians
Indian independence activists from Punjab (British India)
Indian logicians
Indian people of World War II
Indian prisoners and detainees
Indian revolutionaries
Academic staff of Islamia College University
20th-century Muslim scholars of Islam
Muslim reformers
Pakistani humanitarians
Pakistani logicians
Pakistani mathematicians
Pakistani philosophers
Pakistani politicians
Pakistani Sunni Muslims
Scholars from Amritsar
People from Lahore
Punjabi people
University of the Punjab alumni
World War II political leaders
Theistic evolutionists